Christopher Ernest King (1 February 1944 – 23 January 2022) was a New Zealand cricket umpire, born in England. He stood in three Test matches between 1993 and 1997 and 25 ODI games between 1992 and 1999.

See also
 List of Test cricket umpires
 List of One Day International cricket umpires

References

1944 births
2022 deaths
Sportspeople from Slough
New Zealand Test cricket umpires
New Zealand One Day International cricket umpires